I1, i1, or I-1 may refer to:

 Haplogroup I-M253, a human Y-chromosome haplogroup occurring at greatest frequency in Scandinavia
 , a 1926 Imperial Japanese Navy submarine
 Motorola i1, a smartphone by Motorola
 LB&SCR I1 class, a 1906 British class of 4-4-2 steam tank locomotives
 Polikarpov I-1, a 1923 Soviet monoplane fighter
 I1, a rank-into-rank axiom in mathematical set theory
 I won, as it is pronounced similarly